Garfield W. Brown (March 15, 1881 – December 24, 1967) was an American lawyervand businessman.

Brown was born in Pipestone County, Minnesota. He went to Pipestone Area High School in Pipestone, Minnesota. Brown received his law degree from University of Minnesota Law School and was admitted to the Minnesota bar. Brown lived in Glencoe, McLeod County, Minnesota. Brown served in the Minnesota House of Representatives from 1911 to 1914 and was a Republican.

References

1881 births
1967 deaths
People from Glencoe, Minnesota
People from Pipestone County, Minnesota
University of Minnesota Law School alumni
Minnesota lawyers
Republican Party members of the Minnesota House of Representatives